The spotted skink (Flexiseps melanurus) is a species of skink endemic to Madagascar.

References

Reptiles of Madagascar
Reptiles described in 1877
Flexiseps
Taxa named by Albert Günther